USS Pattina (SP-675) was a United States Navy patrol vessel in commission from 1917 to 1919.

Pattina was built as a private motorboat of the same name by the Luders Marine Construction Company at Stamford, Connecticut, in 1916. On 10 September 1917, the U.S. Navy acquired her under a free lease from her owner, B.F. Schwarts, for use as a section patrol boat during World War I. She was commissioned on 22 October 1917 as USS Pattina (SP-675).

Pattina conducted patrols along the United States East Coast for remainder of World War I and into early 1919. She was returned to Schwarts on 19 February 1919.

References

Department of the Navy Naval History and Heritage Command Online Library of Selected Images: U.S. Navy Ships: USS Pattina (SP-675), 1917-1919
NavSource Online: Section Patrol Craft Photo Archive Pattina (SP 675)

Patrol vessels of the United States Navy
World War I patrol vessels of the United States
Ships built in Stamford, Connecticut
1916 ships